Ivana Maksimović Anđušić  (born 2 May 1990) is a Serbian sport shooter.

She represented Serbia at the 2012 Summer Olympics, most notably winning a silver at the Women's 50 metre rifle three positions. Ivana was chosen as 2014 Summer Youth Olympics shooting athlete role model. She was chosen to be the flag bearer for Serbia at the opening ceremony of the 2016 Summer Olympics.

At the 2016 Summer Olympics, she competed in 10 metre air rifle and 50 metre rifle three positions. In the 10 m air rifle competition, she finished in 12th place during the qualification round and did not advance to the final. In the 50 m rifle three positions competition, she finished 19th in the qualification round and did not advance to the final.

Personal life
She is a daughter of Serbian sports shooter and Olympic gold medalist Goran Maksimović. In 2015, she married basketball player Danilo Anđušić.

References

External links
 Interview in English
 
 

1990 births
Living people
Sportspeople from Belgrade
Serbian female sport shooters
ISSF pistol shooters
Olympic shooters of Serbia
Shooters at the 2012 Summer Olympics
Shooters at the 2016 Summer Olympics
Olympic silver medalists for Serbia
Olympic medalists in shooting
Medalists at the 2012 Summer Olympics
European champions for Serbia
European Games competitors for Serbia
Shooters at the 2015 European Games
Mediterranean Games gold medalists for Serbia
Competitors at the 2013 Mediterranean Games
Universiade medalists in shooting
Mediterranean Games medalists in shooting
Universiade silver medalists for Serbia
Universiade bronze medalists for Serbia
Medalists at the 2015 Summer Universiade
21st-century Serbian women